John Winchcombe may refer to:

 John Winchcombe (traditionally known as Jack O'Newbury; c.1489–1557), clothier and MP for Cricklade and Great Bedwyn
 John Winchcombe (died 1574) (1519-1574), MP for Reading, Ludgershall and Wootton Bassett, son of the above

See also
 John de Winchcombe (14th century), English priest